Gabriel Ionuț Dodoi (born 27 September 1998) is a Romanian professional footballer who plays as a forward for Viitorul Târgu Jiu.

References

External links
 
 

1998 births
Living people
Sportspeople from Târgu Jiu
Romanian footballers
Association football forwards
Liga I players
Liga II players
CS Pandurii Târgu Jiu players
CFR Cluj players
Sepsi OSK Sfântu Gheorghe players
FC Rapid București players
CSM Reșița players
ACS Viitorul Târgu Jiu players